PelicanHPC is an operating system based on Debian Live, which provides a rapid means of setting up a high performance computer cluster.

PelicanHPC was formerly known as ParallelKNOPPIX.

Versions

References

External links
 
 

Operating system distributions bootable from read-only media
KDE
Concurrent computing
Parallel computing